Konrad Dąbkowski (born 16 February 1989) is a Polish former racing cyclist.

Major results

2006
 3rd  Team sprint, UEC European Junior Track Championships
2007
 3rd  Kilo, UEC European Junior Track Championships
2013
 1st Memoriał Andrzeja Trochanowskiego
 1st Stage 3 Course de la Solidarité Olympique
 Les Challenges de la Marche Verte
4th GP Oued Eddahab
9th GP Al Massira
 6th Jūrmala Grand Prix
 7th Riga Grand Prix
2014
 1st Puchar Ministra Obrony Narodowej
 1st Stage 2 Memorial Grundmanna I Wizowskiego
 1st Stage 1 Course de la Solidarité Olympique
 5th Visegrad 4 Bicycle Race – GP Polski
2015
 2nd Memoriał Romana Siemińskiego
 3rd Puchar Ministra Obrony Narodowej

References

External links

1989 births
Living people
Polish male cyclists
People from Nysa County
Sportspeople from Opole Voivodeship